Dopoguerra (Post-war) is the second full-length album by Italian alternative rock band Klimt 1918. It was released in 2005 on the German label, Prophecy Productions, which gave the band exposure outside their home country.

Compared to the band's previous effort, Undressed Momento, Dopoguerra features a much lighter sound, losing a great amount of gothic metal influences to venture into a more post-rock and new wave influenced style.

Track listing
 "_" – 1:17
 "They Were Wed By the Sea" – 4:36
 "Snow Of '85" – 4:38
 "Rachel" – 4:57
 "Nightdriver" – 5:55
 "Because of You, Tonight" – 3:57
 "Dopoguerra (Postwar)" – 3:29
 "La Tregua (The Truce)" – 3:39
 "Lomo" – 3:49
 "Sleepwalk in Rome" – 5:30

Luxus Edition Digipak
The limited edition comes in a digipak with an additional bonus disc, featuring two unreleased tracks ("Never Ever" and "Cry A Little") and several new versions of album tracks with different titles:

 "They Were Wed By The Sea (rarefied)" – 8:17
 "Never Ever" – 4:30
 "Yanqui Girl In Rafah" – 5:17
 "Cry A Little" – 4:56
 "Driving At The End Of The Night" – 4:04
 "Sleepwalk In Rome (Chaos/Order remix)" – 14:01

Personnel
Marco Soellner — vocals, guitar
Alessandro Pace — guitar
Davide Pesola— bass
Paolo Soellner — drums
Francesco Sosto — keyboards on tracks 1, 3, 5, 6 and on all bonus tracks
Fabiola Pereira — cello on bonus tracks 1, 2

References 

2005 albums
Klimt 1918 albums